Sauville may refer to the following places in France:

 Sauville, Ardennes, a commune in the Ardennes department
 Sauville, Vosges, a commune in the Vosges department
 Sauville,  a fictional country in the anime Gosick